Rose Branch is a stream in Clay County in the U.S. state of Missouri.

Rose Branch was named after Thad Rose, an early settler.

See also
List of rivers of Missouri

References

Rivers of Clay County, Missouri
Rivers of Missouri